Judith G. O'Connor (December 1, 1936 in St. Louis, Missouri) was an American politician who served as a Missouri state representative.  She was first elected in a special election on June 29, 1971, to fill the vacancy created by the death of her husband on June 7, 1971.  She had married Patrick J. O'Connor in 1959 in St. Louis County, Missouri, with whom she had four children.  She was educated at St. Edwards Elementary School and at Incarnate Word High School.

She is the mother of Missouri state representative Patrick James O'Connor Jr.

References

External links
Judith O'Connor ourcampaigns.com

1936 births
Women state legislators in Missouri
Democratic Party members of the Missouri House of Representatives
Year of death missing